The Sanctuary of Our Lady of Sameiro or Sanctuary of Sameiro is a sanctuary and Marian shrine in Espinho, in the surroundings of the city of Braga, Portugal.

History 

Its construction was initiated in the 19th century, by Father Martinho da Silva, in neoclassical style. Artistically not have much interest except the silver tabernacle that we can see on the main altar and the image of the patron saint, held in Rome by the sculptor Eugénio Maccagnani and brought to the sanctuary in 1880. 

Construction was begun on 14 July 1863 on the domed church of Nossa Senhora do Sameiro (Our Lady of Sameiro). The founder of the shrine was the Vicar of Braga, Padre Antonio Martinho Pereira da Silva. The sanctuary is the largest Marian devotional shrine in Portugal, second only to the Sanctuary of Fátima.

Pope Pius IX granted the decree of Canonical coronation towards the Marian image on 22 December 1876. The rite of coronation was executed on 12 June 1904 via Archbishop Giuseppe Macchi. 

Pope John Paul II visited the Marian shrine on 15 May 1982.

Roman Catholic churches in Braga
Basilica churches in Portugal
Roman Catholic shrines in Portugal
Church buildings with domes